Natalie Walker is an American vocalist, songwriter and musician from Indiana
who first came to prominence as part of the group Daughter Darling. While her time in the low-key electronica trip hop outfit was promising, Walker decided on a solo career, and released her first album Urban Angel in 2006, which was produced by the duo Stuhr (Dan Chen and Nate Greenberg). The album made minor waves commercially, but it was a pair of songs from the full-length that helped Walker's career, one of which, a remix of "Quicksand", was featured in the Sofia Coppola film Marie Antoinette, while another, "Waking Dream", was featured in the film Circles, made it to television, and was featured in an episode of Grey's Anatomy. Her follow-up, With You, was released in 2008, and also featured production by Stuhr. Walker's EP titled Spark was released on June 21, 2011 via Dorado music and features production by Ted Bruner (Katy Perry, Kesha, Plain White T's) and Dan Chen and Nate Greenberg of Stuhr, the Brooklyn-based production team behind her debut album and With You.

Biography
Growing up in a born again Christian family, Walker spent her childhood in Indianapolis, Indiana. She attended Avon High School from 1996 to 2000 in Avon, Indiana. She started her first band when she was a junior in high school and played in small coffee shops and festival gigs around town.  At first, she was influenced by bands and artists like Portishead, Ani DiFranco, U2, Alison Krauss, and Björk.  Later, Walker attended a Christian college for two years before moving to Philadelphia to form Daughter Darling.

In recent years, she has claimed to be agnostic and often writes about her struggle to break free from conventional religion.

Walker currently resides in Denver, Colorado.

Daughter Darling 
After Daughter Darling's initial search for a vocalist failed to produce any results, Travis and Steven Fogelman posted an advertisement on a website, which was answered by Walker, whose acoustic roots were founded in folk and funk singing. She downloaded the backing for "Sad and Lonely", and recorded the vocals the next day. She left college a year later, and joined the group. Daughter Darling's debut album Sweet Shadows was released on Plain Jane Records in 2002 and was nominated for "Best CD of 2003" at the Philadelphia Music Awards.

Urban Angel 
Urban Angel, her solo album debut, was co-written by Walker with producers Dan Chen and Nate Greenberg (of Stuhr). Walker has said that she wanted each song to be unforgettable.

Spark
Natalie Walker's third studio album is a captivating blend of electronic and acoustic textures as a foundation for her richly expressive vocals. She wrote and recorded half the album with her previous collaborators Dan Chen and Nate Greenberg, AKA Brooklyn-based production team Stuhr (Mya, Nicole Atkins, Bebel Gilberto), and half with L.A. writer-producer Ted Bruner (Katy Perry, Ke$ha, Plain White T's). The music occupies a sweet spot between pop and electronica, incorporating Moog, vocoders, cellos and pianos into its buttery, evocative mix. The songs on the album are very personal to Natalie, "I revealed things about myself in that song that I’d never said publicly," she relates. "But Ted refused to let me include a single detail that wasn't true.”

Strange Bird
Walker released a new album, Strange Bird, on March 10, 2015.

Discography

With Daughter Darling 
 Sweet Shadows (2002)

Solo 
Studio albums
 Urban Angel (2006)
 With You (2008)
 Spark (2011)
 Strange Bird (2015)

EPs
 Live at the Bunker (live, 2009)
 Evenfall (2019)

Singles
 "No One Else" (2006)
 "Quicksand" (2006)
 "Crush" (2006)
 "Waking Dream" (King Britt Remix) (2008)
 "Over & Under" (2008)
 "Pink Neon" (2008)
 "With You" (Dive Index Remix) (2009)
 "Uptight" (2011)
 "Cool Kids" (2011)

With Mouchette 
 Orchids to Ashes (EP, 2009)
 Glimmer (EP, 2010)

Side projects 
 Dive Index – Mid/Air (2007)
 Dive Index – Collisions: The Mid/Air Remixes (remix album, 2008)

References

External links
  – official site
 
 Natalie Walker YouTube channel

American women singer-songwriters
Living people
Year of birth missing (living people)
People from Avon, Indiana
Trip hop musicians
American women in electronic music
21st-century American women singers
21st-century American singers
Singer-songwriters from Indiana